The 1926 United States Senate elections in Indiana took place on November 2, 1926. Incumbent Republican Senator James E. Watson was re-elected to a second full term in office over Democratic attorney Albert Stump.

Democratic nomination

Candidates
William A. Cullop, former U.S. Representative from Vincennes
L. William Curry, opponent of Prohibition
John E. Frederick, Kokomo businessman
George W. Rauch, former U.S. Representative from Marion
L. Ert Slack, former U.S. Attorney
Albert Stump, World War I veteran and Indianapolis attorney

Frederick ran with the backing of former U.S. Senator and party boss Thomas Taggart. Curry ran primarily for the modification of the state's "bone dry" prohibition law, rather than national prohibition.

Primary
In a non-binding primary, Cullop won with Stump finishing second.

Convention
On the first convention ballot, Frederick was first with Cullop second. On the second ballot, Stump passed Cullop for second place. On the third, there was a stampede to his candidacy as Frederick and Cullop supporters abandoned their candidates for Stump.

General election

Candidates
William H. Harris (Prohibition)
Albert Stump, World War I veteran and attorney (Democratic)
Forrest Wallace (Socialist)
James E. Watson, incumbent Senator since 1916 (Republican)

Results

See also 
 1926 United States Senate elections

References

1926
Indiana
United States Senate